Galdón or Galdon is a Spanish surname. Notable people with the surname include:

Joseph Galdon (1928 – 2010), Filipino Jesuit priest and writer
Pablo Galdón (born 1985), Argentine tennis player
Raúl Ibáñez Galdón (born 1972), retired Spanish footballer

Spanish-language surnames